The 2019 Cornell Big Red football team represented Cornell University in the 2019 NCAA Division I FCS football season as a member of the Ivy League. They were led by seventh-year head coach David Archer and played their home games at Schoellkopf Field. They finished the season 4–6 overall and 3–4 in Ivy League play to tie for fourth place. Cornell averaged 4,295 fans per game in 2019.

Previous season

The Big Red finished the 2018 season 3–7, 2–5 in Ivy League play to finish in seventh place.

Preseason

Preseason media poll
The Ivy League released their preseason media poll on August 8, 2019. The Big Red were picked to finish in seventh place.

Schedule

Game summaries

at Marist

at Yale

Georgetown

at Harvard

Colgate

Brown

Princeton

at Penn

at Dartmouth

Columbia

References

Cornell
Cornell Big Red football seasons
Cornell Big Red football